"Crazy Blues" is a song, renamed from the originally titled "Harlem Blues" song of 1918, written by Perry Bradford.  Mamie Smith and Her Jazz Hounds recorded it on August 10, 1920, which was released that year by Okeh Records (4169-A). The stride pianist Willie "The Lion" Smith appeared in photographs associated with the recording session, although Bradford claimed to have played piano on the recording (albeit buried in the mix). Within a month of release, it had sold 75,000 copies. 

Although there were many recordings made of songs with blues in the title during the previous decade, this recording is considered a landmark as the first significant hit recording in the blues genre ever issued. Another claim is that it was the first recording with a blues title by a black artist. The record made Smith the first African American female popular singer to lead a commercial recording. The success of "Crazy Blues" opened up the race record market, for the first time major record companies started producing records with an African American buyer in mind.

"Crazy Blues" was entered into the Grammy Hall of Fame in 1994, and later entered into the National Recording Registry of the United States Library of Congress by the National Recording Preservation Board in 2005.

The 1920 Mamie Smith version of the song was used in episode 10 of season 1 of Boardwalk Empire in 2010.

References

External links 
  from "Paradise in Harlem" (1939)

1920 in music
1918 songs
1921 singles
Okeh Records singles
United States National Recording Registry recordings